Unbreakable may refer to:

 Unbreakable: My Story, My Way, a book written by Jenni Rivera
 Unbreakable (horse) (1935–1962), a Thoroughbred racehorse and sire

Film and television 
 Unbreakable (film series), a trilogy directed by M. Night Shyamalan
 Unbreakable (film), a 2000 suspense thriller by M. Night Shyamalan
 Unbreakable (TV series), a 2008 UK reality programme
 Impact Wrestling Unbreakable, a series of professional wrestling events

Music

Albums 
 Unbreakable (Backstreet Boys album), 2007
 Unbreakable (Dareysteel album), 2016
 Unbreakable (Dead or Alive album), 2001
 Unbreakable (Down to Nothing album), or the title song, 2008
 Unbreakable (Fireflight album), or the title song (see below), 2008
 Unbreakable (Janet Jackson album), or the title song (see below), 2015
 Unbreakable (MyChildren MyBride album), 2008
 Unbreakable (New Years Day album), or the title song, 2019
 Unbreakable (Primal Fear album), or the title song, 2012
 Unbreakable (Saving Grace album), or the title song, 2010
 Unbreakable (Scorpions album), 2004
 Unbreakable – The Greatest Hits Volume 1, by Westlife, or the title song (see below), 2002
 Unbreakable: A Retrospective 1990–2006, by the Afghan Whigs, 2007
 Unbreakable (Mickey Guyton EP), 2014
 Unbreakable, by Mad Sin, 2020
 Unbreakable, by The Working Hour, 2009
 Unbreakable, an EP by Heaven's Basement, 2011

Songs 
 "Unbreakable" (Alicia Keys song), 2005
 "Unbreakable" (Birds of Tokyo song), 2018
 "Unbreakable" (Conchita Wurst song), 2011
 "Unbreakable" (Evermore song), 2007
 "Unbreakable" (Fireflight song), 2007
 "Unbreakable" (James Cottriall song), 2010
 "Unbreakable" (Janet Jackson song), 2015
 "Unbreakable" (Nick Howard song), 2012
 "Unbreakable" (Sinplus song), 2012
 "Unbreakable" (Stefanie Heinzmann song), 2009
 "Unbreakable" (Westlife song), 2002
 "Unbreakable", by B.A.P. from Warrior, 2012
 "Unbreakable", by Before the Dawn from My Darkness, 2003, re-recorded in Rise of the Phoenix, 2012
 "Unbreakable", by Blaze Ya Dead Homie from The Casket Factory, 2016
 "Unbreakable", by Bon Jovi from Have a Nice Day, 2005
 "Unbreakable", by Bunt, 2020
 "Unbreakable", by Dirty South, 2014
 "Unbreakable", by FEMM from Femm-Isation, 2014
 "Unbreakable", by Jade Valerie from Bittersweet Symphony, 2008
 "Unbreakable", by Jamie Scott, 2014
 "Unbreakable", by Madison Beer, 2014
 "Unbreakable", by Michael Jackson from Invincible, 2001
 "Unbreakable", by The Murder of My Sweet, 2012
 "Unbreakable", by Nana Mizuki, B-side of the single "Pop Master", 2011
 "Unbreakable", by Sabaton from The Art of War, 2008
 "Unbreakable", by Seventh Wonder from Mercy Falls, 2008
 "Unbreakable", by Stratovarius from Nemesis, 2013
 "Unbreakable", by Temple One, 2014
 "Unbreakable", by Veil of Maya from Id, 2008
 "Unbreakable", by Winds of Plague from Decimate the Weak, 2008

See also
 Indestructible (disambiguation)